Kakagi Lake, also known as Crow Lake, is a lake in both Unorganized Kenora District and the township of Sioux Narrows-Nestor Falls, Kenora District, in Northwestern Ontario, Canada. It is just north of the community of Nestor Falls, and right across Ontario Highway 71 from Stevens Bay on Lake of the Woods. It also feeds Lake of the Woods through a series of lakes starting with Cedartree Lake.

Geography
It is a body of water that is essentially not charted, and caution must be taken when navigating this body of water. The lake has many islands such as Gold Point Island, Green Island, Mink Island, Bear-Beaver Island, Alora Island, Mosquito Point Island and Pine Island. There are several spots on the lake frequented by campers as well as several natural recreational areas such as Jumping Rock, Seagull Rock and Soft Sand Beach.

There are small number of private cabins mostly on Young's Bay, and several commercial fishing lodges and resorts. Young's Bay is named after Clyde Young who came to Canada from Chicago in 1932 and was founder of Crow Lake Camp.

The Ojibways of Onigaming First Nation lay claim to much of Kakagi Lake; their Sabaskong Bay 35D reserve is on the southwest shore of the lake.

The lake also has a history of gold mining.

Natural history
Kakagi lake is well known for its lake trout fishing because of its many spawning reefs throughout the lake and deep water basins equally well distributed. Musky, smallmouth bass, northern pike and lake whitefish also inhabit Kakagi.  Kagaki's forage fish include perch, rock bass, cisco, lake shiners and a variety of other minnow species.

Recreation

Canoe Route
There is a popular canoe route known as the Kakagi Lake-Cameron Lake canoe route. The loop is considered of moderate difficulty and starts and ends at Kakagi. Native pictographs and bald eagles exist on Stephen Lake. The length is 51 km and typically takes 4 days across 5 portages. Then move north through a narrows and then  until the first portage to Cedartree Lake. Then follow the west shore of Cedartree Lake into the river and continue the length of the river until the portage to Flint Lake. Next follow the rest of the river into Flint Lake and then go to the south shore until the next portage into Stephen Lake via Cameron Creek. Move east down Stephen Lake via the narrows. The pictographs are found just after the narrows and to the left just around the bay. Move to the east on Stephen Lake into the bay until the portage to Cameron Lake via Cameron Creek.

Popular culture
Although the book is set in Northern Ontario, Crow Lake is not actually about Kakagi (Crow) Lake.

See also
List of lakes in Ontario

References

External links 
 Bull Moose Lodge
 Boreal Bay Lodge
 Black Bear Fishing
 Muskie Bay Resort

Lakes of Kenora District
Hudson's Bay Company trading posts